Milbech or Millbech (French: Muhlbach, English; Millbrook) is a village in the commune of Contern, in southern Luxembourg.  , the village has a population of 100. It is located directly adjacent to Moutfort, separated by a railway with the only links being a road bridge and a pedestrian foot-tunnel.

Contern
Villages in Luxembourg